Lawrence A. Kenney Jr. (June 13, 1920 – December 13, 2021) was an American professional basketball player. He appeared in one game for the Youngstown Bears during the 1945–46 National Basketball League season.

A native of Philadelphia, Pennsylvania, Kenney attended St. Joseph's Preparatory School and then Saint Joseph's University, where he played for the men's basketball team. After his brief professional basketball career, Kenney earned a law degree from the University of Pennsylvania Law School. He turned 100 in June 2020, and died on December 13, 2021, at the age of 101.

References

1920 births
2021 deaths
All-American college men's basketball players
American centenarians
American men's basketball players
Basketball players from Philadelphia
Centers (basketball)
Men centenarians
Saint Joseph's Hawks men's basketball players
University of Pennsylvania Law School alumni
Youngstown Bears players